Beleswar is a Shiva temple and its adjoining sea beach in Puri district of Odisha, India.

References

External links

Hindu temples in Puri district
Shiva temples in Odisha